OB 293 was a North Atlantic convoy which ran during the battle of the Atlantic in World War II.

Prelude
OB 293 was a west-bound convoy of 37 ships, either in ballast or carrying trade goods, and sailed from Liverpool on 2 March 1941 bound for ports in North America.

They were led by LtCdr Rowlands of Wolverine, which would stay with them till they left the Western Approaches. (At this stage of the campaign escort groups were too scarce to provide "end-to-end" cover).

On 6 March 1941 the convoy was sighted by  commanded by Prien.
After sending a sighting report he set to shadowing the convoy, being joined throughout the day by three other boats.

Action
On the night of the 6/7 March the pack launched its attack.

In the early hours of 7 March U-99 slipped into the convoy from ahead, to attack on the surface; she torpedoed the tanker Athelbeach, damaged by U-47, sinking her, and the whale factory ship Terje Viken.
U-70 damaged a British tanker, Delilian, and a Dutch tanker, Mijdrecht. The latter rounded on  U-70 and attempted to ram; U-70 was forced to crash-dive to escape.
UA hit a freighter, but did not sink her.

The response of the escorts was swift and effective. The U-boats were subjected to a fierce bombardment as the warships chased down contacts; over 100 depth charges were expended over a five-hour period.
UA was damaged but was able to escape;
U-99 only escaped by diving deep and waiting out the attack.
U-70 was damaged in the onslaught and forced to the surface, where she was fired on and sunk by the corvettes Camellia and Arbutus.

U-47 avoided damage and was able to stay in contact with the convoy, sending further reports and requesting re-inforcements. He had also been able to torpedo Terje Viken, which was straggling after being damaged, though she still remained afloat. The escorts attempted to bring her to port, but she finally sank on the 14th; her loss was credited to both U-99 and U-47.

Meanwhile, on the night of 7th/8th, at about 1am on the 8th, Wolverine sighted a U-boat on the surface which she identified as U-47. She and  Verity attacked, and after four hours, which had shown evidence of damage, the U-boat was driven to the surface within yards of Wolverine, before diving again. The destroyer sent down a pattern of depth charges and was rewarded with an underwater explosion, marked by an orange glow, and flames that broke the surface.

Aftermath
Wolverine was credited with destroying U-47, and this featured in the official record until the late 1990s. However, after reviewing the available records modern historians regard this attack as being directed against UA, which was badly damaged, but survived to reach port.

No conclusion can be reached about the fate of U-47, and it is thought likely to be the result of a diving accident.

The success of the defence of OB 293, with the loss of Prien, coupled with the successful defence of Convoy HX 112, and the loss of two more aces, Kretschmer and Schepke, one week later, marks a minor turning point in the Atlantic campaign.

Ships involved

Merchant ships

Escorts

U-boats

References

 Stephen Roskill : The War at Sea 1939–1945 Vol I (1954). ISBN (none)
 Dan van der Vat : The Atlantic Campaign (1988). 
 Arnold Hague : The Allied Convoy System 1939–1945 (2000). SBN (Canada) 1 55125 033 0 . ISBN (UK) 1 86176 147 3
 Paul Kemp : U-Boats Destroyed (1997). 
 Axel Neistle : German U-Boat Losses during World War II (1998). 

OB293
C